LOL is the debut studio album by South Korean girl group GFriend. It was released by Source Music on July 11, 2016, distributed by LOEN Entertainment. The album contains ten songs, including the single "Navillera", and two instrumental tracks. It has a retro musical style with a diverse range of genres, including pop, rock, reggae, R&B, and house.

Release and promotion

LOL is GFriend's first studio album, released eighteen months after their debut. It follows their three successful extended plays that comprise their "school series" trilogy. It was released at midnight on July 11, 2016, in two versions: "Laughing Out Loud" and "Lots of Love". That same day, GFriend held two showcases in Seoul, where they performed songs from the album. The media showcase was held at Yes24 Live Hall in Gwangjin-gu, and the showcase for fans was broadcast live via Naver's V app. The group then promoted the album on music shows, starting with SBS MTV's The Show on July 12, where they performed "Navillera" and "Gone with the Wind". In the second week of promotion, GFriend won all five music show awards, on The Show, Show Champion, M! Countdown, Music Bank, and Inkigayo. They won a total of 14 music show awards, including triple crowns (three consecutive wins) on The Show, M! Countdown, and Inkigayo.

They promoted the album with the showcase tour The L.O.L Asia showcase, started on July 10, 2016 in Yes24 Live Hall, Seoul, South Korea, ended in Taipei International Convention Center, Taipei, Taiwan on October 1, 2016.

Composition
The album has a retro musical style, with a more diverse range of genres compared to GFriend's past releases, in order to appeal to a wider audience. The title is an acronym for both "Laughing Out Loud" and "Lots of Love", which represents the dual concept of "playful and bubbly" and "feminine and graceful" songs. "Navillera" is a pop-rock song with a guitar solo, written by Iggy and Seo Yong-bae, who wrote the group's previous three singles. "Navillera" is a reference to Cho Chi-hun's poem "The Nun's Dance", and is a phrase used to describe a fluttering action similar to the movement of a butterfly. The song's lyrics describe a girl's feeling of wanting to fly like a butterfly to be with the person she loves.

"Distance" is the group's first attempt at reggae, and features piano, guitar, and harmonica. "Water Flower" is a rock song with drum sounds and guitar distortion effects, and "Mermaid" is a pop ballad written by Source Music's group Mio, inspired by the fairy tale "The Little Mermaid". "Sunshine" is an R&B song with electronic rhythm and acoustic piano harmony, while "Compas" is in the house music genre. "Click" is a medium-tempo pop song produced by Hyuk Shin, and is in the style of 1990s American pop music. "Gone with the Wind" is the group's first dubstep song.

Reception
Miriam Steglich of the Korea JoongAng Daily described the album as "express[ing] the heart and feeling of a young girl", with songs ranging from "bright and energetic" to "soothing and relaxing". She said the diversity of genre and unique instrumentation was impressive, and identified "Navillera" as the album's standout track. However, she regretted that it was not "much of a departure from their last, leaving room for improvement and expectations for their next effort."

The album was a commercial success in South Korea. It was the fourth best-selling physical release during the month of July 2016, selling 40,680 units. It entered the Gaon Album Chart at number three, while "Navillera" topped the Gaon Digital Chart. "LOL", "Mermaid", and "Gone with the Wind" also charted in the top 100, at numbers 80, 83, and 87, respectively. In the United States, LOL charted at number seven on the Billboard World Albums chart, while "Navillera" was number 12 on the World Digital Songs chart.

Track listing

Personnel 
Credits adapted from the album liner notes.

Locations

Recorded at Vibe Studio 
Mixed at Cube Studio 
Mixed at MasterPiece SoundLab 
Mixed at Vibe Studio 
Mixed at W Studio 
Mixed at Joombas Factory USA 

Personnel

GFriend – vocals
Kwak Jung-shin – recording engineer , mixing engineer 
Jung Mo-yeon – recording engineer 
Oreo – all instruments 
Young – guitar 
Jo-ssi Ajeossi – mixing engineer 
Hong Beom-gyu – drum programming , guitar 
Kim Woong – piano, synthesizer 
Kim So-ri – background vocals 
Kwon Seok-hong – string arrangement 
Yoong String – strings 
Seo Yong-bae – drum programming 
Iggy – keyboard, synthesizer 
Master Key – mixing engineer, drum programming, keyboard, synthesizer 
Score – drum programming, piano 
Lee Tae-wook – guitar 
Im Jin-cheol – harmonica 
Shin Jae-bin – mixing engineer 
Kim Ye-il – bass guitar 
Mio – all instruments 
Choi Hoon – bass guitar 
Jung Ho-hyun – all instruments 
EJ Show – keyboard 
Geum Jo – background vocals 
Oh Ji-hoon – drum programming 
No Eun-jong – guitar 
Kim Jung-yoon – synthesizer 
Jo Joon-sung – mixing engineer 
Maxx Song – recording director 
MRey – mixing engineer 
Jung Soo-wan – guitar 
Ho Hyun – keyboard

Charts

Weekly charts

Year-end charts

Notes

References

External links
 Album highlight medley on YouTube
 "Navillera" on YouTube

GFriend albums
2016 debut albums
Korean-language albums
Kakao M albums
Hybe Corporation albums